Daddies on Request is a Mexican comedy-drama streaming television series for children and adolescents, which is produced by BTF Media for the Walt Disney Company. In Latin America, the premiere of the first season took place on July 13, 2022, on Disney+. It released in the USA on November 23 on Disney+. The Season 2 Is confirmed

Plot  
On her thirteenth birthday, California receives an unexpected gift: the key to a van. She receives this from her mother Itzel, who mysteriously disappeared many years ago and now wants to see California again in Zacatecas. California's three adoptive fathers, Miguel, Morgan, and Diego, initially disagree with this plan, but they realize that it would make California happy. Now the goal is to bring mother and daughter back together! An unusual family odyssey full of fun, emotional and challenging moments begins, which culminates in an unforgettable road trip through Mexico with its different landscapes and its culture. This journey will not only leave a lasting impression on everyone involved, but you will also grow with all challenges and take with you new insights.

Cast 
 Jorge Blanco as Miguel
 Michael Ronda as Morgan
 Lalo Brito as	Diego
 Farah Justiniani as California
 Valérie Camarena Ibarra as young California 
 Fátima Molina as Itzel
 Itatí Cantoral as	Maricarmen
 Karla Farfán as Paulina
 Mauricio Isaac as Patricio Sandoval
 Alfonso 'Poncho' Borbolla as Riquezes
 Daniel Haddad as Gamboa
 Martín Castro as Emilio
 Giovanna Reynaud as Denisse
 Santiago Torres as Neto
 Hernán Mendoza as	Gustavo

Episodes

References

External links 
 
 

Comedy-drama television series
Television shows filmed in Mexico
2020s Mexican television series
Spanish-language television shows
Disney+ original programming